Zero Tolerance Knives (ZT Knives) is a knife brand of Kai USA, headquartered in Tualatin, Oregon, United States. Both Zero Tolerance and Kai USA are members of the Kai Group, a global cutlery company.

History
The first ZT knives were produced in 2006 alongside Kai USA's longstanding, Kershaw Knives brand. The original line of ZT knives included collaborations between custom knifemaker Ken Onion and Strider Knives. Early products were combat knives, but Zero Tolerance later expanded its market to include more general use knives. Currently, all ZT products are manufactured in Kai USA's Tualatin, Oregon facility.

Awards
Over the course of the brand's history, eight individual Zero Tolerance knives have won awards at the annual Blade Show in Atlanta, Georgia. The following models have received recognition:

Products

Zero Tolerance Knives manufactures USA-made folding knives and fixed blades. The brand has worked with custom knife makers such as Les George, Jens Anso, Dmitry Sinkevich, Todd Rexford, Rick Hinderer, R.J. Martin, Tim Galyean, Grant and Gavin Hawk, Ken Onion, and Gus T. Cecchini. ZT Knives has also collaborated with Emerson Knives.

External links
ZT Knives official site

References 

Knife manufacturing companies
Companies based in Tualatin, Oregon
2006 establishments in Oregon
Manufacturing companies established in 2006
American companies established in 2006